Tree of Science may refer to:

 Tree of Science (Ramon Llull), a work by Ramon Llull, written in Rome between 1295 and 1296
 Tree of Science (sculpture), a sculpture at the Middle East Technical University Ankara Campus

See also
 Tree of the knowledge of good and evil